Louis III of Germany  may refer to:
Louis the Younger, son of Louis II of Germany
Louis the Child, grandnephew of the previous. He would rather have been Louis IV of Germany